was a town located in Higashikubiki District, Niigata Prefecture, Japan.

As of 2003, the town had an estimated population of 3,521 and a density of 50.14 persons per km². The total area was 70.23 km².

On January 1, 2005, Yasuzuka, along with the villages of Maki, Ōshima and Uragawara (all from Higashikubiki District), the towns of Itakura, Kakizaki, Ōgata and Yoshikawa, the villages of Kiyosato, Kubiki, Nakagō and Sanwa (all from Nakakubiki District), and the town of Nadachi (from Nishikubiki District), was merged into the expanded city of Jōetsu.

Transportation

Highway

References

See also
 Jōetsu, Niigata

Dissolved municipalities of Niigata Prefecture
Jōetsu, Niigata